Robert John Ingham (18 October 1924 – 6 May 2000) was an English footballer who played as a winger. He scored 109 goals from 430 appearances in the Football League for Gateshead. He also played non-league football for Newburn and North Shields.

Career

Ingham started his career with non-league Wallsend St. Lukes and signed amateur forms for Gateshead when he was aged 14, in 1938. He played for Gateshead reserves and Newburn before signing for Gateshead in August 1947. He scored a total of 119 goals in 468 appearances in the league and FA Cup and DSP cups for Gateshead before moving on to non-league North Shields in 1958. He returned to Gateshead from 1961–1964,while Jack Fairbrother and Bobby Mitchell were managers. He played a further 58 games scoring 21 goals.
His overall record of 526 games and 140 goals still stand.

Sources

References

1924 births
2000 deaths
People from Hebburn
Footballers from Tyne and Wear
English footballers
Association football wingers
Newburn F.C. players
Gateshead F.C. players
North Shields F.C. players
English Football League players
Gateshead A.F.C. players